Inge Lieckfeldt (born 4 October 1941) is a German speed skater. She competed in two events at the 1964 Winter Olympics.

References

External links
 

1941 births
Living people
German female speed skaters
Olympic speed skaters of the United Team of Germany
Speed skaters at the 1964 Winter Olympics
Sportspeople from Szczecin
20th-century German women